Orutsararmiut Native Council (ONC) is the largest tribe in the Bethel, Alaska region. It is a federally recognized tribe and a governing body for the community of Bethel, Alaska.

History 
The Orutsararmiut Native Council (ONC) is the largest tribe in the Bethel, Alaska region. It is a federally recognized tribe and a governing body for the community of Bethel, Alaska. Zach Brink served as the ONC executive director from 2011 to 2015. In 2016, Gene Peltola Sr. was the ONC executive director. Peter Evon also served as an ONC executive director before serving in as the Kenaitze Indian Tribe executive director of tribal administration.

In the fall of 2018, the ONC received a two-year grant from the Administration for Community Living to help reduce the harm and maltreatment of Yup'ik elders.

In 2021, the executive director was Mark Springer. Springer was fired in late 2021. On June 28, 2021, the ONC appealed the Alaska Department of Environmental Conservation's about the Donlin Gold mine's water quality certificate. According to a summer 2021 poll of 300 ONC tribal members, 76% opposed the Donlin Gold mine project, while only 10.5% supported it. The mineral rights for the mine are owned by the Calista Corporation, a Alaska Native corporation the represents many Alaska Native groups including the ONC.

In 2021, the ONC received  from the American Rescue Plan Act of 2021. Some of the funds were used to provide  payments to eligible tribal members.

Former executive director Zach Brink resumed the role from August 2, 2021 until late March 2022 when he resigned citing health reasons. In July 2022, Brian Henry became the ONC executive director. In 2022, Walter Jim was serving as the tribal chairman. In July 2022, the ONC endorsed tribal member Mary Peltola's campaign for the 2022 Alaska's at-large congressional district special election.

References

External links
 Official website

Native American tribes in Alaska
Bethel, Alaska
Yupik